Prezident Blaník is a Czech satirical film directed by Marek Najbrt. It stars Marek Daniel as a fictional Czech lobbyist Antonín "Tonda" Blaník. Blaník is the main protagonist of the satirical web series Kancelář Blaník. The film is about Blaník's candidacy in the 2018 presidential election.

Background
The character of Tonda Blaník was introduced by web television Stream as a protagonist of the satirical series Kancelář Blaník. The series parodies Czech politics. On 12 October 2017, a video was released in which Blaník announced his candidacy for Czech president. The creators held meetings with people with Marek Daniel in character as Blaník. On 9 November 2017, Blaník attended the first presidential debate. On the same day the creators announced that Blaník's candidacy was part of the preparation for a new film called Prezident Blaník. The plot of the film would react to the actual election. Filming concluded on 20 December 2017. Multiple endings were filmed with the final ending to depend on the result of the real election.

Plot
Tonda Blaník discovers that, according to one interpretation of the constitution, he would be able to sell the Czech Republic if he was President. He decides to sell the country to China and announces his candidacy for the 2018 presidential election and starts gathering signatures. He promises voters corruption available to everybody and Lithium for every family. He gathers 100,000 signatures but his assistant Žížala fails to bring the signatures to the Ministry of Interior, and Blaník is therefore not registered. He decides to support one of other candidates but doesn't know who will win. He decides to convince all the other candidates of his plan, with the exception of Miloš Zeman. Blaník subsequently has a change of heart and decides to support Zeman, because he is the only candidate who won't sell the Czech Republic to China. Blaník supports Zeman but finds out that Zeman sold the Czech republic to Russia and decides to steal the national jewels and flee the country. He changes his mind at the border.

Cast

 Marek Daniel as Tonda Blaník
 Michal Dalecký as Žížala 
 Halka Třešňáková as Lenka
 Jakub Železný as himself
 Tomáš Sokol as himself
 Tomáš Sedláček as himself
 Ladislav Špaček as himself
 Tomáš Klus as himself
 Jan Potměšil as himself
 Helena Třeštíková as herself
 Ivo Mathé as himself
 Jan Hřebejk as himself
 Roman Vaněk as himself
 Olga Sommerová as herself
 Ivan Bartoš as himself (and a father of Lenka's son)
The film also features real presidential candidates such as Jiří Drahoš, Michal Horáček or Mirek Topolánek

Release
The film was previewed on 30 January 2018 at Lucerna Cinema. The second preview was held on 31 January 2018. It was attended by Miroslav Kalousek and Jiří Drahoš. It premiered on 1 February 2018.

References

External links
 
 

2018 films
2010s political comedy films
2010s Czech-language films
Films about elections
Czech political comedy films
2018 Czech presidential election